Grady Eugene Housley (born December 19, 1937) is an American former politician, entrepreneur, and rancher.

Career 
Grady’s professional history began in 1959 when Marietta Police Department (Marietta GA) Chief Ernest Sanders selected him for a police officer position.  During his 5.5-year career with the Marietta PD, Grady was elected by fellow officers as a police department representative to the City Retirement Board.  He also attended the University of Georgia (UGA) Seminar on Homicide Investigation during this time.

In 1964, Grady accepted an appointment to serve as a probation officer at the Cobb County Juvenile Court.  The appointment was made by Cobb County Superior Court Judge James Manning. Grady was promoted from that position to the referee of the court, where he served for 5 years.

While serving the Cobb County Juvenile Court, Grady was elected to the Cobb County Board of Education for one term (1964-1968).  At 27 years old, Grady was the youngest school board member in the State of Georgia. In 1968, Grady became the youngest school board chairman in the State of Georgia.  Additionally, Grady was appointed to the Democratic Executive Committee in 1968 by then Gov. Lester Maddox.

Having served in local elected positions for some time, Grady was elected to the Georgia House of Representatives as a Democrat.  There, he served a total of 4 terms (District 117: 1969-1970, 1971-1972; District 20: 1977-1979, 1980-1981). *Reference – Georgia Official and Statistical Register* While serving as a State Representative, Grady served on multiple committees: Ways and Means, Education, Highways, and Urban Affairs.  He also served as the vice-chairman of the Game and Fish Committee and the Local Legislation Committee.

In 1981, Georgia Gov. George Busbee appointed Grady to a 4-year term on the Georgia Private Detective and Security Agencies Board.  He was reappointed to the Board in 1985 by Georgia  Gov. Joe Frank Harris for a 2-year term.  Grady was elected chairman of the Board in 1985, serving as a board member for a total of 6 years.

In 1987, Grady co-founded the First Peoples Bank of Cobb County.  He served the bank as a board member and secretary treasurer for some time.

Other ventures 
In 1969, Grady became a licensed real estate broker in the state of Georgia.  He also founded Housley Realty, which is a Georgia-based real estate brokerage and development group.  Grady owns Housley Realty to this day.

In 1974, Grady founded the Centaur Investigative Agency.  The Agency served as a private detective and investigation agency for several years.

For some time, he was the co-owner of Housley Riding Equipment (Marietta GA) with his brother and father.  Housley Riding Equipment was an equestrian supply store that sold boots, saddlery, clothing, livestock feed, and other related items.  Grady also owner several Georgia ranches throughout the state and in Alabama: the Etowah River Cattle and Horse Ranch (Cherokee County GA); the Tallapoosa River Horse and Cattle Ranch (Cleburne County AL); the Flint River Cotton, Peanut, and Wild Game Plantation (Daugherty County GA).

Between 1992 and 2012, he received several trademarks and patents.  A notable example of these inventions is US patent #5,128,210 (TM Swiss Potato), a method of cooking and preparing potatoes.  He owns the Conch Republic Border Patrol, a clothing company that exemplifies the Florida Keys lifestyle and culture.  Grady has owned and managed multiple vacation rental properties throughout Florida, as well as commercial properties in the Atlanta Metropolitan area.

References

Living people
1937 births
Democratic Party members of the Georgia House of Representatives